The following is a list of official U.S. state grasses.


Table

See also
Lists of U.S. state insignia

References

.

Grasses
U.S. state grasses
.